Valayanad is a village in  Kozhikode taluk, in Kozhikode District, Kerala, India. It is one of 53 villages in the taluk. The village office is situated at Cheriya Mankav, near the Mankav bypass road.

References

Villages in Kozhikode district
Kozhikode downtown